Chris Romano also known as "Romanski" (born March 28, 1978) is an American actor, writer, producer, and director, most commonly known for co-creating, producing and starring in Spike TV's Blue Mountain State.

Early life
Romano grew up in Nashua, New Hampshire, and graduated from Nashua High School South. He then went on to Plymouth State College for 1 year before transferring and graduating from Emerson College in 2000.

Chris claims that he and his family were in the Witness Protection Program. According to Chris, his father, John Romano (Shaheen), a.k.a. "Johnny Cool", was the most prolific arsonist in the history of Massachusetts in the '60s and '70s, and had struck a deal with authorities to turn State's Evidence in return for protection.

Television career

Blue Mountain State
Romano co-created the show, and also plays the role of Sammy Cacciatore, the school's mascot (and Alex's roommate), who is constantly searching for girls and excuses to get drunk, with his drinking often leading him into misadventure. Romano also produced, starred in, and co-wrote the film adaptation.

Other
Romano has also played small roles in the hit CBS television show, How I Met Your Mother as Adam "Punchy" Punciarello, Ted's (Josh Radnor) high school friend, along with appearances in Comedy Central's The Sarah Silverman Program and Drunk History, the TV short series, Big Time In Hollywood, FL, Acceptable TV, but not The Hard Times of RJ Berger. He has a brief non-speaking role in the mockumentary 7 Days in Hell where he plays a streaker with whom Andy Samberg's character has sex on the court. He also has played a role in Tour de Pharmacy as the steroid aggressive cyclist Jabin Dolchey. Romano was also credited as the co-executive producer of 24 episodes of the CBS show How I Met Your Mother.

References

External links

Living people
American male television actors
American people of Lebanese descent
1978 births
Male actors from Boston
People from Nashua, New Hampshire
Plymouth State University alumni
Emerson College alumni